Lakka-varapu-kota  or L. Kota is a village in Vizianagaram district of the Indian state of Andhra Pradesh.

Geography 
It has an average elevation of 60 meters (200 feet).

Demography 
Lakkavarapukota Mandal has a population of 74,413 in 2001. Males consists of 25,267 and females 25.270 of the population. The average literacy rate is 52%, below the national average of 59.5%. Male literacy rate is 65% and that of females 39%.

References 

Villages in Vizianagaram district
Mandal headquarters in Vizianagaram district